Parliamentary elections are due to be held in Togo in December 2023.

Electoral system
The 91 members of the National Assembly are elected by closed list proportional representation from 30 multi-member constituencies ranging in size from two to ten seats. Seats are allocated using the highest averages method.

References

2023 elections in Africa
2023 in Togo
2023